In algebraic geometry, the geometric genus is a basic birational invariant  of algebraic varieties and complex manifolds.

Definition

This definition, as the dimension of

then carries over to any base field, when  is taken to be the sheaf of Kähler differentials and the power is the (top) exterior power, the canonical line bundle.

The geometric genus is the first invariant  of a sequence of invariants  called the plurigenera.

Case of curves

In the case of complex varieties, (the complex loci of) non-singular curves are Riemann surfaces. The algebraic definition of genus agrees with the topological notion. On a nonsingular curve, the canonical line bundle has degree .

The notion of genus features prominently in the statement of the Riemann–Roch theorem (see also Riemann–Roch theorem for algebraic curves) and of the Riemann–Hurwitz formula. By the Riemann-Roch theorem, an irreducible plane curve of degree d has geometric genus

where s is the number of singularities when properly counted

Genus of singular varieties

The definition of geometric genus is carried over classically to singular curves , by decreeing that

is the geometric genus of the normalization . That is, since the mapping

is birational, the definition is extended by birational invariance.

See also
Genus (mathematics)
Arithmetic genus
Invariants of surfaces

Notes

References
 
 

Algebraic varieties